Bojan Brnović (Cyrillic: Бојан Брновић; born 10 February 1979) is a Montenegrin former professional footballer who played as a striker.

Club career
During his active career, Brnović played for numerous clubs, most notably for Zeta in his country, as well as for Debrecen and Győr in Hungary.

International career
Brnović made his debut for Serbia and Montenegro in an April 2020 friendly match against Lithuania in which he immediately scored a goal and has  earned a total of 2 caps, scoring 1 goal. His other and final international cam e three weeks after his debut against Ecuador.

Personal life
He is the older brother of Nenad Brnović.

Statistics

Honours
Debrecen
 Nemzeti Bajnokság I: 2005–06
 Szuperkupa: 2005, 2006
Čelik Nikšić
 Montenegrin Cup: 2011–12
 Montenegrin Second League: 2011–12

References

External links

 HLSZ profile
 
 
 
 

1979 births
Living people
Footballers from Podgorica
Association football forwards
Serbia and Montenegro footballers
Serbia and Montenegro under-21 international footballers
Serbia and Montenegro international footballers
Montenegrin footballers
FK Zabjelo players
FK Mladost Apatin players
FK Zeta players
FK Partizan players
FK Obilić players
Debreceni VSC players
Győri ETO FC players
Diósgyőri VTK players
FK Čelik Nikšić players
Second League of Serbia and Montenegro players
First League of Serbia and Montenegro players
Nemzeti Bajnokság I players
Montenegrin Second League players
Serbia and Montenegro expatriate footballers
Expatriate footballers in Hungary
Serbia and Montenegro expatriate sportspeople in Hungary
Montenegrin expatriate footballers
Montenegrin expatriate sportspeople in Hungary